In macroeconomics, the secondary sector of the economy is an economic sector in the three-sector theory that describes the role of manufacturing. It encompasses industries that produce a finished, usable product or are involved in construction.

This sector generally takes the output of the primary sector (i.e. raw materials) and creates finished goods suitable for sale to domestic businesses or consumers and for export (via distribution through the tertiary sector). Many of these industries consume large quantities of energy, require factories and use machinery; they are often classified as light or heavy based on such quantities. This also produces waste materials and waste heat that may cause environmental problems or pollution (see negative externalities). Examples include textile production, car manufacturing, and handicraft.

Manufacturing is an important activity in promoting economic growth and development. Nations that export manufactured products tend to generate higher marginal GDP growth, which supports higher incomes and therefore marginal tax revenue needed to fund such government expenditures as health care and infrastructure. Among developed countries, it is an important source of well-paying jobs for the middle class (e.g., engineering) to facilitate greater social mobility for successive generations on the economy. Currently, an estimated 20% of the labor force in the United States is involved in the secondary industry.

The secondary sector depends on the primary sector for the raw materials necessary for production. Countries that primarily produce agricultural and other raw materials (i.e., primary sector) tend to grow slowly and remain either under-developed or developing economies. The value added through the transformation of raw materials into finished goods reliably generates greater profitability, which underlies the faster growth of developed economies.

References

 
+2
+2